  
Saltfleetby is a village and civil parish in the East Lindsey district of Lincolnshire, England on the coast of the North Sea, approximately  east from Louth and  north from Mablethorpe. The parish had a population of 599 in the 2001 Census, decreasing to 568 at the 2011 Census.

A local name for the village is Soloby.

Until 1999 Saltfleetby comprised three parishes: Saltfleetby St Peter, Saltfleetby All Saints and Saltfleetby St Clement, each one centred on the church that gave it its name.

The hamlet of Three Bridges is south of Saltfleetby St Peter.

Saltfleetby contains a wooden village hall, fishing lakes with a campsite and shop, and the Prussian Queen public house.

Saltfleetby Gas Field, north of North End Lane, is part of the neighbouring village of South Cockerington.

Second World War

The Second World War defences constructed in and around Saltfleetby have been documented by William Foot. They included extensive minefields between the Great Eau river and the dunes, a large number of pillboxes and a Home Guard shelter in the field adjacent to The Prussian Queen.

Geography and ecology
A section of the parish seashore is salt marsh between Saltfleetby and the North Sea, and is part of the Saltfleetby-Theddlethorpe Dunes National Nature Reserve, which has sea dunes and both saltwater and freshwater marshes. The reserve is one of only around 60 places in the UK where the natterjack toad is found. Many halophyte (salt-tolerating) plant species are found there as well as wild orchids. Grey seals breed farther north in Donna Nook nature reserve within the Saltfleet and North Somercotes parishes.

See also

All Saints Church, Saltfleetby
St Peter's Church, Saltfleetby

References

External links

Saltfleetby-Theddlethorpe Dunes National Nature Reserve; Natural England. Retrieved 18 May 2012
Saltfleetby C of E Primary School

Populated coastal places in Lincolnshire
Civil parishes in Lincolnshire
Nature reserves in Lincolnshire
East Lindsey District
Villages in Lincolnshire